John Baxter Browning Bryant (January 24, 1957 – November 16, 2019) was an American singer-songwriter, whose greatest commercial popularity was before and during his early teens.

Background
Known professionally as Browning Bryant, he was the only child of Maud and Ray Bryant, and a long-time resident of Pickens, South Carolina. He attained success singing folk-pop that was uncharacteristically mature and introspective for a pre-teen heartthrob. In 1969, the first of his several songs to generate international sales was Games that Grown Up Children Play, leading to televised appearances on The Merv Griffin Show, The Mike Douglas Show, The Ed Sullivan Show, The Kraft Music Hall (10 times), The Tonight Show (December 24, 1970), and a brief Las Vegas career. He was nominated "Best Boy Singer" in a reader poll by 16 Magazine, then a favorite with teenagers.

In 1974, Bryant's last commercial album was released. New Orleans hit-maker Allen Toussaint produced the album and wrote most of its songs. It featured backing by members of the R&B group The Meters. Though he was 15 and then 16 years old when the album was recorded, his mellifluous vocals are remarkably mature. His three self-penned songs also belied his age, with one, "Cure My Blues", being covered by blues singer Ellen McIlwaine. (Allmusic calls her version "majestic".) Despite recording in a style drastically different than his earlier work, it turned out that Bryant was well-paired with Toussaint's trademark syncopated funk.

In the 1970s Bryant briefly ventured into theater with the lead role in a musical road show production of Tom Sawyer.

After his career waned, Bryant graduated from Clemson University with a political science degree, and then worked for many years in management for the Belk department store chain. He continued to write songs and record privately.

Bryant died at home, survived by his parents.

Discography

Commercial albums
Patches (1969, DOT DLP 25968)
 Patches
 You Mean All the World to Me
 Hey Little Girl
 Running Bear
 Moods of Mary
 What is a Youth
 Tower of Strength
 Games that Grown Up Children Play
 It's a Beautiful Day
 Poppa Says (Dawn Holds Another Day)
 She Thinks I Still Care
 As Usual

One Time in a Million (1970, RCA LSP 4356)
 One Time in a Million
 Yesterday
 Sweet Caroline
 Don't Wait Till Mornin' Comes
 Raindrops Keep Fallin' on My Head
 For Once in My Life
 Happy Man
 Today
 What the World Needs Now
 Jean
 La la la (If I Had You)

 Browning Bryant (1974, Reprise MS 2191)
 You Might Say (Toussaint)
 Say You Will (Toussaint)
 Leave the Rest to Molly
 This is My Day (Toussaint)
 Cure My Blues (Bryant)
 Liverpool Fool (Toussaint)
 Blinded by Love (Toussaint)
 Cover Girl (Toussaint)
 Losing (Bryant)
 Performance (Toussaint)
 Home (Bryant)
 Produced by Allen Toussaint

In 2013, "Browning Bryant" was remastered and rereleased as a cd with original art as mini-sleeve by WEA Japan. It is available as a digital download and through major streaming services.

Private recordings
 Some Favorites of Mine
 The Girl from Ipanema (DeMorales/Jobim)
 Suddenly (Diamond/Ocean)
 And I Love You So (McLean)
 The Christmas Song (Torme)
 The Summer Wind (Mercer/Mancini)
 The Nearness of You (Washington/Carmichael)
 Here's that Rainy Day (Burke/Huesen)
 Smile (Parsons/Turner/Chaplin)
 Recorded February 9, 1992, at Reflection Sound Studios, Charlotte, North Carolina
 Digitally remixed at Workhorse Studio, Easley, South Carolina

 Frankandsince
 "I Could Write a Book" (Richard Rodgers, Lorenz Hart)
 "Fly Me to the Moon" (Bart Howard)
 "I've Got a Crush on You (George Gershwin, Ira Gershwin)
 "I've Got You Under My Skin" (Cole Porter)
 "It Had to be You" (Isham Jones, Gus Kahn)
 "Witchcraft" (Cy Coleman, Carolyn Leigh)
 "Our Love is Here to Stay" (George Gershwin, Ira Gershwin)
 "But Not for Me" (George Gershwin, Ira Gershwin)
 "Don't Get Around Much Anymore" (Duke Ellington, Bob Russell)
 Recorded July 9, 1995, at Reflection Sound Studios, Charlotte, North Carolina
 Digitally remixed at Workhorse Studio, Easley, South Carolina

 Merry Christmas From Browning Bryant
 This Christmas
 The Christmas Song
 Silver Bells
 Have Yourself a Merry Little Christmas
 The Little Drummer Boy
 Mary's Little Boy Child
 Do You Hear What I Hear
 What Child is This
 The First Noel
 Away in a Manger
 Let it Snow
 Happy Holidays
 Produced, arranged, all vocals and instruments by Browning Bryant, except Wade Powell, rhythm guitar and Maud Bryant, harmony vocal on Silver Bells.
 Recorded November 2003 at Workhorse Studio, Easley, South Carolina

Various artist compilation albums
 Deep Ear (1974, Warner Bros. PRO 591); "This is My Day" from the album Browning Bryant.

Singles
 "Games that Grown Up Children Play" / "Hey Little Girl" (1969, Dot 17193)
 "She Thinks I Still Care" / "Poppa Says" (Dot 17236)
 "New Way to Live" / "Patches" (1969, Dot 17311)
 "Little Altar Boy" / "They Stood in Silent Prayer" (1969, Dot 17328)
 "One Time in a Million" / "Tina" (1970, RCA 9825)
 "Liverpool Fool" / "Cover Girl" (1974, Reprise REP 1201)

References

External links

 Browning Bryant (discography, lyrics, photos, articles)
 Two Beautiful Boys For You
 

1957 births
2019 deaths
American rhythm and blues singers
American child singers
American male pop singers
People from Pickens, South Carolina
Singers from South Carolina